CFTK is a Canadian radio station that broadcasts an adult hits format at 590 AM in Terrace, British Columbia. The station is branded as Bounce 590. The station is owned by Bell Media. Prior to May 18, 2021, CFTK had an adult contemporary format branded as EZ Rock.

The station began broadcasting in 1960 at 1140 AM, and later moved to its current frequency in 1963.

As part of a mass format reorganization by Bell Media, on May 18, 2021, CFTK flipped to adult hits under the Bounce branding.

References

External links
Bounce 590
 

Ftk
Ftk
Ftk
Ftk
Radio stations established in 1960
1960 establishments in British Columbia